Winsten is a surname. Notable people with the surname include: 

 Archer Winsten (1904–1997), American film critic
 Beth Tanenhaus Winsten, American filmmaker, screenwriter, and visual artist
 Jay Winsten, American academic
 Stephen Winsten (1893–1991), British writer

See also
 Winston (name)